Gualöv is a locality situated in Bromölla Municipality, Skåne County, Sweden with 530 inhabitants in 2010.

Gualöv Church is a medieval church with well-preserved frescos and a medieval altarpiece.

References 

Populated places in Bromölla Municipality
Populated places in Skåne County